MiRGator  is a database for the functional annotation of miRNAs.

See also
 MiRNA
 Gene silencing

References

External links
 https://www.webcitation.org/5rRw378wJ?url=http://genome.ewha.ac.kr/miRGator/

Biological databases
RNA
MicroRNA